Stacey Day is an English association footballer who played for Newcastle Jets and Adelaide United in the Australian W-League.

Career

Day also played with Merewether United in the Northern NSW Women's Premier League in the 2009 season.

Prior to the 2014 W-League, she suffered an anterior cruciate ligament injury which kept her out of football for two and a half years.

References

External links
 Newcastle Jets Profile

English women's footballers
Living people
Newcastle Jets FC (A-League Women) players
Adelaide United FC (A-League Women) players
1988 births
Expatriate women's soccer players in Australia
Women's association football defenders